Madhu Dikshit (born 21 November 1957) is an Indian cardiovascular biologist, pharmacologist, who served as (2015–2017) director of the Central Drug Research Institute of the Council of Scientific and Industrial Research. Known for her studies on cardiovascular pathologies such as thrombosis, she is also an adjunct professor at Carleton University. Her studies have been documented by way of a number of articles and ResearchGate, an online repository of scientific articles has listed 204 of them. All the three major Indian science academies namely Indian Academy of Sciences, National Academy of Sciences, India and Indian National Science Academy have elected her as their fellow and she is also a recipient of the Young Scientists Medal (1989) as well as the Professor K. P. Bhargava Memorial Medal (1999) of the Indian National Science Academy. The Department of Biotechnology of the Government of India awarded her the National Bioscience Award for Career Development, one of the highest Indian science awards, for her contributions to biosciences in 2000.

Selected bibliography

See also 
 Neutrophils
 Plasma protein

Notes

References

External links 
 
 

N-BIOS Prize recipients
Indian scientific authors
Living people
Fellows of the Indian Academy of Sciences
Indian women biologists
Fellows of The National Academy of Sciences, India
Fellows of the Indian National Science Academy
1957 births
Indian pharmacologists